Prachi is a village in Sutrapada taluka, Gir Somnath district, Gujarat, India. Prachi is a historical place, described in Hindu scriptures Prabhas Puran and Padma Puran.
[[Where the Saraswati River, which is situated on the Upper Kodinar Una Highway, is situated 22 km from Somnath, where the Pandavas worshiped the pond and started pouring water there, the salvation of their brave brethren, and Lord Krishna, performed the liberation of his Yaduvansh. For the peace of the souls of the fathers in such a prachary tirtha, panch bali, Narayan Bali, Pretbali, Leel, Nagbali, Pitru Tarpan, Grah Shanti, Nakshatra Shanti,Laghu Rudra, Navachandhi Yagna, Kal Sarap Yoga etc. Meet Rituals and Brahmin Meals as well.
Where the Saraswati River, which is situated on the Upper Kodinar Una Highway, is situated 22 km from Somnath, where the Pandavas worshiped the pond and started pouring water there, the salvation of their brave brethren, and Lord Krishna, performed the liberation of his Yaduvansh. For the peace of the souls of the fathers in such a prachary tirtha, panch bali, Narayan Bali, Pretbali, Leel, Nagbali, Pitru Tarpan, Grah Shanti, Nakshatra Shanti,Laghu Rudra, Navachandhi Yagna, Kal Sarap Yoga etc. Meet Rituals and Brahmin Meals as well.
[[( Shastri Shree Khanjan bhai Rameshbhai Purohit
 Mo: - 9428088057
Shastri Shree Maulikbhai Rameshbhai Purohit
Mo: - 9726785874, 9898705110
 Prachi Tirth, Taluko: - Sutrapada, District: - Gir Somnath (Saurashtra) Gujarat , INDIA.)]]
Prachi is situated along National Highway 8E. The village is served by Prachi Road Junction railway station which comes under Western Railway. The railway station is situated 12 km away at Panikotha village in Talala taluka.

Villages in Gir Somnath district